Gastón Sangoy (born 5 October 1984) is a former professional Argentine footballer who last played as a striker for Atlètico Paraná.

Career 
A product of the Boca Juniors youth system in Argentina, he has been loaned out for most of his young career to clubs in the Netherlands, Israel and Cyprus. Playing mainly as a second striker, but also as a right and left winger because of his ability to use both his feet with great success, he is renowned for his excellent direct free-kicks.

Universitario de Deportes
In January 2006 he moved to Peru, to play for Universitario de Deportes. He played Copa Libertadores and scored 3 goals in 5 games.

Stint in Israel and settle in Cyprus
After trialling with Maccabi Tel Aviv, the club turned down the loan offer citing the players weight problems. He then found his way to Liga Leumit side, Hapoel Ashkelon. There he had a breakout season and guided the club to the Israel State Cup final. Despite his performances in the cup, the club was relegated to the Liga Artzit and Sangoy left Israel to sign with Cypriot club, Apollon Limassol. In April 2008, after several decent performances with his new club, he signed a four-year extension to his contract until 2012. Despite being a very disappointing season for Apollon Limassol, 2008–09 was for Sangoy the most prolific season in his career having scored 20 goals in 27 championship matches and as a result being the fans favourite. In May 2009 a very controversial decision was taken by the Cyprus Football Association (CFA). After announcing a month before that the league's top scorer was to be decided at the end of the regular season, who at the time was Sangoy, the CFA reversed its decision by saying that the top scorer was to be decided after the end of the play-offs. Thus Sangoy, who during this time was preserved by his coach for the more important cup matches, missed the "golden boot". In 2009, he became Apollon's captain.

In 2010, he played a major role in helping his team Apollon Limassol win the Cypriot Cup.

Al Wakrah
Sangoy joined Qatar Stars League side Al Wakrah in July 2015.

References

External links

1984 births
Living people
People from Paraná, Entre Ríos
Argentine footballers
Association football forwards
Boca Juniors footballers
AFC Ajax players
Club Universitario de Deportes footballers
Categoría Primera A players
Millonarios F.C. players
Hapoel Ashkelon F.C. players
Cypriot First Division players
Apollon Limassol FC players
La Liga players
Sporting de Gijón players
Qatar Stars League players
Al-Wakrah SC players
Mumbai City FC players
Nea Salamis Famagusta FC players
Argentine expatriate footballers
Argentine expatriate sportspeople in Spain
Expatriate footballers in Peru
Expatriate footballers in Colombia
Expatriate footballers in the Netherlands
Expatriate footballers in Israel
Expatriate footballers in Cyprus
Expatriate footballers in Spain
Expatriate footballers in Poland
Sportspeople from Entre Ríos Province